Homer Township is a civil township of Midland County in the U.S. state of Michigan. As of the 2010 census, the township population was 4,009.

Geography

Demographics
As of the census of 2010, there were 4,009 people, 1,521 households, and 1,182 families residing in the township. The racial makeup of the township was 96.68% White, 0.64% African American, 0.62% Native American, 0.5% Asian, 0.02% Pacific Islander, 0.12% from other races, and 1.4% from two or more races. Hispanic or Latino of any race were 1.55% of the population.

There were 1,521 households, out of which 31.1% had children under the age of 18 living with them, 64.7% were married couples living together, 8.3% had a female householder with no husband present, and 22.3% were non-families. 17.0% of all households were made up of individuals, and 6.2% had someone living alone who was 65 years of age or older.  The average household size was 2.6 and the average family size was 2.9.

In 2000, the township the population was spread out, with 27.0% under the age of 18, 7.0% from 18 to 24, 29.8% from 25 to 44, 24.8% from 45 to 64, and 11.4% who were 65 years of age or older.  The median age was 37 years. For every 100 females, there were 96.9 males.  For every 100 females age 18 and over, there were 96.6 males.

The median income for a household in the township was $44,924, and the median income for a family was $51,029. Males had a median income of $45,742 versus $28,622 for females. The per capita income for the township was $20,574.  About 5.7% of families and 5.7% of the population were below the poverty line, including 3.9% of those under age 18 and 9.7% of those age 65 or over.

Transportation
 connects Midland to the east with Mount Pleasant and Big Rapids to the west.

Education 
Bullock Creek Public Schools
Bullock Creek High School
Midland Public Schools

Sites of interest 

References

Townships in Midland County, Michigan
Townships in Michigan
1862 establishments in Michigan
Populated places established in 1862